Charlie Grace is an American crime drama television series created by Robert Singer that aired on ABC from September 14, 1995 to October 19, 1995.

Premise
Charlie was kicked off the force for busting fellow officers, and now he is a divorced private investigator who has to solve cases while taking care of his daughter.

Cast
Mark Harmon as Charlie Grace
Cindy Katz as Leslie Loeb
Leelee Sobieski as Jenny Grace
Roberto Costanzo as Artie Crawford

Episodes

References

External links

1995 American television series debuts
1995 American television series endings
1990s American crime drama television series
English-language television shows
American Broadcasting Company original programming
Television shows set in Los Angeles
Television series by Warner Bros. Television Studios